Popokvil Waterfalls is a waterfall in Kampot Province, Cambodia. It is a two-tiered fall, with a shallow pool in between.

References

External Links

Waterfalls of Cambodia
Geography of Kampot province